Waiting, Waitin, Waitin', or The Waiting may refer to:

Film
 Waiting (1991 film), a film by Jackie McKimmie
 Waiting... (film), a 2005 film starring Ryan Reynolds
 Waiting (2007 film), a film by Zarina Bhimji
 Waiting (2015 film), an Indian drama film starring Naseeruddin Shah and Kalki Koechlin
 The Waiting (film), a 2020 American horror/romance/comedy by F. C. Rabbath
 The Good Neighbor (film) (working title The Waiting), a 2016 American thriller film

Literature
 Waiting (novel), a novel by Ha Jin
 Waiting (picture book), a 2015 children's book by Kevin Henkes
 "The Waiting" (short story), or "The Wait", a 1950 story by Jorge Luis Borges

Music
 The Waiting (band), a Christian pop rock band
 Waiting (KLF film), a video by The KLF

Albums
 Waiting (Bobby Hutcherson album) (1976)
 Waiting (Fun Boy Three album) (1983)
 Waiting (Thursday album) (1999)
 Waiting... (EP), am EP by The Rockfords
 The Waiting (album), an album by Royal Wood
 Waiting, an album by Graham Ord
 The Waiting, an album by Peter Buffett

Songs
 "Waiting" (Green Day song), 2001
 "Waiting" (Kian song), 2018
 "Waiting" (Porcupine Tree song), 1996
 "Waiting..." (City and Colour song), 2008
 "The Waiting" (song), by Tom Petty and the Heartbreakers, 1981
 "Waiting", by 311 from Don't Tread on Me
 "Waiting", by Cheryl Cole from Messy Little Raindrops
 "Waiting", by Chris Isaak from San Francisco Days
 "Waiting", by Dwight Yoakam featuring Deana Carter from Dwight's Used Records
 "Waiting", by Fireflight from The Healing of Harms
 "Waiting", by Girls Aloud from Chemistry
 "Waiting", by Jay Sean from My Own Way
 "Waiting", by Joe Satriani from Shapeshifting
 "Waiting", by Joy and the Boy from Paradise
 "Waiting", by Lala Karmela
 "Waiting", by Madonna from Erotica
 "Waiting", by Miz from Story Untold
 "Waiting", by Pennywise from From the Ashes
 "Waiting", by the Red Jumpsuit Apparatus from Don't You Fake It
 "Waiting", by the Rentals from Return of the Rentals
 "Waiting", by Ringo Starr from Beaucoups of Blues
 "Waiting", by RL Grime, Skrillex and What So Not
 "Waiting", by Santana from Santana
 "Waiting", by Shiny Toy Guns from We Are Pilots
 "Waiting", by the Suburbs from Dream Hog EP
 "Waiting", by Trapt from Someone in Control
 "Waiting", by Ultravox, the B-side of the single "Sleepwalk"
 "Waiting", by White Town from Socialism, Sexism & Sexuality
 "Waiting", by Zhavia Ward
 "Waiting", from the musical Marguerite
 "Waiting (Reprise)", by George Michael from Listen Without Prejudice Vol. 1

Other uses
 Waiting (Degas), a pastel on paper by Edgar Degas
 "Waiting" (SpongeBob SquarePants), a 2007 television episode
 Waiting staff, work as a waiter or waitress

See also
 Patience
 Waiting period
 Pause (disambiguation)
 Still Waiting (disambiguation)
 Wait (disambiguation)